Garry James Blaine (April 19, 1933 – December 19, 1998) was a Canadian ice hockey player.

Blaine began his professional hockey career with the Montreal Royals in the Quebec Hockey League in 1953.  Blaine then played his one and only game in the National Hockey League for the Montreal Canadiens the next season.  He would then have spells in the QHL with the Trois-Rivières Lions, Chicoutimi Saguenéens and the Quebec Aces, the Western Hockey League with the Winnipeg Warriors and the Vancouver Canucks, the American Hockey League for the Buffalo Bisons and in the Eastern Professional Hockey League for the Sault Thunderbirds.  With traveling becoming a big problem, Blaine retired in 1960.

See also
 List of players who played only one game in the NHL

External links
 

1933 births
1998 deaths
Buffalo Bisons (AHL) players
Canadian ice hockey right wingers
Chicoutimi Saguenéens (QSHL) players
Montreal Canadiens players
Montreal Royals (QSHL) players
People from Saint Boniface, Winnipeg
Quebec Aces (QSHL) players
Sault Thunderbirds players
Ice hockey people from Winnipeg
St. Boniface Canadiens players
Vancouver Canucks (WHL) players
Winnipeg Warriors (minor pro) players
Winnipeg Canadians players